James O. Dennis (born 25 February 1976) is an American discus thrower.
His personal best throw is 63.55 metres, achieved in June 2008 in Chula Vista, California.

Dennis remains an active Masters athlete, winning the 2018 World Masters Athletics Championships.

References

External links

1976 births
Living people
American male discus throwers
Track and field athletes from Cleveland
Players of American football from Cleveland
Louisville Cardinals football players
African-American male track and field athletes
People from Bedford Heights, Ohio
21st-century African-American sportspeople
20th-century African-American sportspeople